Hua Wenyi (21 February 1941 – 13 April 2022) was a Chinese Kunqu opera performer.

Biography 
Wenyi Hua was born in Shanghai on 21 February 1941 and graduated from the Shanghai Opera School in 1961. For the next ten years, she was a member of the Shanghai Youth Beijing and Kunqu Troupe. She joined the Shanghai Kun Opera Company in 1978 and became its director in 1985. In 1986, she staged The Peony Pavilion at the Edinburgh Festival in Scotland.

In 1989, she went to the United States to perform with the Shanghai Kunqu Opera Troupe. Due to the conflict with the Kunqu Opera Troupe, she stayed in the United States to settle down on her own. With Su Shengyi, a dancer and painted-face actor, she founded the "Hua Kun Research Institute" in Los Angeles, which received certain support from the US government and performs regular performances every year. She also served as a visiting professor at Yale University, Princeton University and other universities, introducing Kunqu Opera to Westerners.

In 2007, under the coordination of the Shanghai Municipal Committee of the Chinese Communist Party, Hua Wenyi finally returned to the Shanghai Kunqu Opera Troupe. She starred in the performance commemorating her teacher Yan Huizhu, and also served as the teacher of the boudoir class of her alma mater Shanghai Opera School.

Weng died on 13 April 2022, at the age of 81.

Awards 
 In 1987, she received the Plum Blossom Award for her performance in the play Yu Zan Ji (The Jade Hairpin).
 In 1997, she won the highest traditional art award from the US government.

References 

1941 births
2022 deaths
Actresses from Shanghai
Kunqu actresses
20th-century Chinese actresses
21st-century Chinese actresses